Kiszko may refer to:

 Martin Kiszko (born 1958), British composer.
 Stefan Kiszko (1952–1993), British tax clerk, wrongly convicted of the murder of Lesley Molseed.